John Blackaller (around 1494–January 1563) of Exeter, Devon, was an English politician.

He may have been born in Totnes in 1494 and he was a Member (MP) of the Parliament of England for Exeter in 1529. He was Mayor of Exeter in 1530–31, 1536–37 and 1548–49. He died in January 1563 and was buried on January 21, 1563.

References

15th-century births
16th-century births
1494 births
1563 deaths
Members of the Parliament of England (pre-1707) for Exeter
English MPs 1529–1536
Mayors of Exeter